John William Hennessy (born March 12, 1955) was an American football player.  He played college football at the linebacker position for the University of Michigan from 1974 to 1976.  He also played professional football in the National Football League (NFL) for the New York Jets from 1977 to 1979.

Early years
Hennessy was born in Chicago, Illinois, in 1955. He attended high school at Gordon Tech, now known as DePaul College Prep in Chicago.

University of Michigan
Hennessy played college football as a defensive tackle for Bo Schembechler's University of Michigan Wolverines football teams from 1974 to 1976.  He started all 12 games at defensive tackle for the 1976 Michigan Wolverines football team. The 1976 Michigan team won the Big Ten Conference championship, advanced to the 1977 Rose Bowl, and finished the season ranked No. 3 in both the AP and UPI Polls.

Professional football
Hennessy was drafted by the New York Jets in the 10th round (256th overall pick) of the 1977 NFL Draft.  As a rookie in 1977, he appeared in 14 games (two as a starter) for the Jets.  The following year, he was a starter at linebacker in all 16 regular season games for the 1978 New York Jets. In 1979, he again appeared in all 16 games for the Jets, though none as a starter.

In May 1980, Hennessy was claimed by the Green Bay Packers after being placed on waivers by the Jets.  He was released the Packers in late July 1980.

References

1955 births
American football linebackers
New York Jets players
Michigan Wolverines football players
Living people